Qaleh Hashem Rural District is a rural district (dehestan) in Shal District, Buin Zahra County, Qazvin Province, Iran. At the 2006 census, its population was 4,873, in 1,303 families.  The rural district has 3 villages.

References 

Rural Districts of Qazvin Province
Buin Zahra County